AbbottVision is a British independent television production company, established in 2008 by the writer, creator and producer Paul Abbott.

Recent productions include three series of No Offence for Channel 4, the BBC One drama series Exile starring John Simm and Jim Broadbent; and Hit & Miss, Sky Atlantic’s first UK drama commission starring Chloë Sevigny, broadcast in May 2012.

AbbottVision has offices in Manchester and London and an ongoing first-look distribution deal with FremantleMedia Enterprises.

Productions

Television
 No Offence: three series (2015 to 2018) for Channel 4 – total 21 episodes.
 Hit & Miss: one series (2012) for Sky Atlantic – total 6 episodes.
 Exile: one series (2011) for BBC One – total 3 episodes.

Film
Tony (2009)
The Odds (2009) Short
Twenty8k (2012) In association with

External links

References

British film studios
Television production companies of the United Kingdom
Film production companies of the United Kingdom